"Hope" is a song by American rapper and singer XXXTentacion from his second studio album, ? (2018). It is dedicated to the victims of the Parkland shooting.

Background 
The song was released on February 21, 2018, as a promotional single for X's upcoming sophomore studio album, ?, which would be released on March 16, 2018. The song, dedicated to those who died in and survived the Parkland shooting, speaks of subject of survivor's guilt that may be experienced by those who survived the shooting, with X singing, "she keep cryin', she keep cryin' every single night ... Said I wanna die, yuh, no, I'm not alright, yuh" and sings of his hope for the survivors of the shooting, "So outside my misery, I think I'll find / A way of envisioning a better life / For the rest of us, the rest of us / There's hope for the rest of us, the rest of us". X also sings about the inaction of political officials following the shooting. The official cover for the song reads as a message from X, "I could never say I understand how you all are feeling, nor can I find the right words say to you, but I do want you all to know, you are not alone. The words at the end of this song are dedicated to you, Douglas High. Sincerely, XXX."

X made headlines when he visited Anthony Borges, a survivor of the Parkland shooting, in the hospital while Borges was recovering from gunshot wounds. X had said in 2016 that he opposed gun control measures, citing this as one of the reasons he disliked 2016 Democratic nominee Hillary Clinton, though he wanted her to win over Republican nominee Donald Trump. X supported Bernie Sanders during the 2016 primary. However, X reversed his stance on the gun control issue following the Parkland shooting.

X himself was the victim of a shooting when he was murdered on June 18, 2018.

Charts

Weekly charts

Year-end charts

Certifications

References

External links
 

2018 songs
Songs written by XXXTentacion
Stoneman Douglas High School shooting
XXXTentacion songs
Songs based on actual events